Bernard Braden Reads Stephen Leacock is a spoken word record, performed by Bernard Braden, and was recorded in front of a live audience at the Oxford Union Society. John Drainie was another performer noted for his similar one-man show as Canadian humorist Stephen Leacock.

Personnel
 Bernard Braden

Track listing
"Insurance Up to Date"
"We Have With Us Tonight"
"The Conjurer's Revenge"
"Impressions of London"
"My Financial Career"
"A Model Dialogue"
"Oxford as I See It"
"Save Me From My Friends"

1969 live albums
Capitol Records live albums
Bernard Braden albums